Beatrice Bonnesen (21 October 1906 – 19 January 1979) was a Danish film actress. She appeared in 21 films between 1926 and 1974. She was born in Copenhagen, Denmark and died in Denmark. She was the daughter of mathematician Tommy Bonnesen.

Filmography

 Det sovende hus (1926)
 Tretten aar (1932)
 Rasmines bryllup (1935)
 Balletten danser (1938)
 Barnet (1940)
 En forbryder (1941)
 Tag det som en mand (1941)
 Ballade i Nyhavn (1942)
 Baby på eventyr (1942)
 Mine kære koner (1943)
 Familien Gelinde (1944)
 Mens sagføreren sover (1945)
 The Swedenhielm Family (1947)
 Hatten er sat (1947)
 Hændte i København, Det (1949)
 Adam og Eva (1953)
 Tre finder en kro (1955)
 Mor skal giftes (1958)
 Farlig sommer (1969)
 Laila Løvehjerte (1972)
 Den sårede Filoktet (1974)

References

External links

1906 births
1979 deaths
Danish film actresses
Actresses from Copenhagen
20th-century Danish actresses